Route 8 of Hong Kong is a dual 3-lane carriageway motorway that links Lantau Island, Tsing Yi Island, Cheung Sha Wan in West Kowloon, and Sha Tin in the southeast New Territories of Hong Kong. It is a combination of many sections.

The section from Lantau to Tsing Yi is made up of the existing North Lantau Highway and Lantau Link, which opened in 1997. Route 8 becomes Airport Road at Chek Lap Kok.

The section between Tsing Yi and Cheung Sha Wan, formerly known as Route 9, is a  dual 3-lane expressway. This section consists of the Stonecutters Bridge, which spans the Rambler Channel from Stonecutters Island and links with the Lantau Link through the Nam Wan Tunnel and West Tsing Yi viaduct and was opened on 20 December 2009. This section provides traffic with a more direct route to the Lantau Link, particularly vehicles from Tsim Sha Tsui and Western Harbour Crossing, previously vehicles had to use Route 3 (Cheung Tsing Bridge and Cheung Tsing Tunnel).

The remaining section links Cheung Sha Wan and Tai Wai, formerly known as Route 16. It is composed of the Eagle's Nest Tunnel and Sha Tin Heights Tunnel, totalling  in length and connecting Route 9 at its Sha Tin terminus. It was opened on 21 March 2008.

Areas passed through by Route 8 include Hong Kong International Airport, Tung Chung, Hong Kong Disneyland, Ma Wan, Tsing Yi, West Kowloon, and Sha Tin.

Route 8 also connects with Route 3, Route 7, and Route 9.

History 
The current Route 8 section was planned in 1990, in line with the Airport Core Programme. The section from Chek Lap Kok to Tsing Yi is called Route 9; the section from Tsing Yi to Sha Tin is called Route 16. The former was opened to traffic on 22 May 1997, including North Lantau Highway, Kap Shui Mun Bridge and Tsing Ma Bridge.

In November 2002, the construction of Route 16 (now Route 8 from Tsing Yi section to Sha Tin section) began. On 31 January 2004, according to the Third generation of Route number system, Route 9 and Route 16 were merged into Route 8. Among them, the Nam Wan Tunnel was completed as early as 25 February 2005, but it was opened to traffic only in 2009 after the completion of the Stonecutters Bridge; until then traffic would have to use Route 3 (including the Cheung Tsing Highway, Cheung Tsing Tunnel and Cheung Tsing Bridge) which linked the two discontinuous segments of Route 8.

In 2008, the section between Cheung Sha Wan and Sha Tin of Route 8 was completed and was named Tsing Sha Highway. The Community Chest held the New Territories Million Walk on this section on February 24. The Tsing Sha Highway was opened to traffic on March 21.

In 2009, the section between Cheung Sha Wan and Tsing Yi section of Route 8 was completed, and the Community Chest held a million trip on the Stonecutters Bridge and the Nam Wan Tunnel on 15 November. The remaining section of the Tsing Sha Highway was opened to traffic on 20 December, and the same day also marked the full completion of Route 8.

Observed roads and exits

See also
 List of streets and roads in Hong Kong
 Lantau Link
 North Lantau Highway
 Tsing Yi North Coastal Road

References

External links
 Details of Route 8 between Cheung Sha Wan and Sha Tin
 Details of Route 8 between Tsing Yi and Cheung Sha Wan
Highway Departments: Route 8 - between Tsing Yi and Cheung Sha Wan

 
Routes in Hong Kong